Hugh Jackman: in Performance is a music concert by Australian actor, musician, and dancer Hugh Jackman.
Jackman performs his favourite Broadway and Hollywood musical numbers, supported by a 17-piece orchestra.

The show was directed by Warren Carlyle.

Setlist
 Oh, What a Beautiful Mornin'
 One Night Only 
 I Won't Dance
 A Crazy Little Thing Called Love / A Little Less Conversation
 L.O.V.E
 The Way You Look Tonight
 Soliloquy
 Fever
 Rock Island
 Take Me or Leave Me
 The Boy Next Door 
 Peter Allen Medley
 Tenterfield Saddler
 Movie Medley
 Over the Rainbow
 Mack the Knife
 Once Before I Go

Reviews
“It’s not just that they don’t make ’em like Hugh Jackman anymore – they never did […] What makes it irresistible is Jackman’s charm, which was most evident in his ad libs, which never crossed the line of becoming glib, and in his ability to roll with the punches, from split pants to handcuffs and even an audience member who shouted out her phone number. No matter what was happening onstage, what launched the audience to its collective feet at the end was simply Hugh and the night and music.”
— San Francisco Chronicle

“Jackman gamely hustled his way through almost two hours of classic show tunes, power ballads and chorus-girl-worthy hoofing. If the Hollywood gigs ever dry up, the A-list hottie can definitely fall back on his cabaret chops. While the world premiere of this one-man show may not have been flawless, it was quite a hoot to spend the evening in the hands of a master showman.”
— The Mercury News

“Hugh Jackman may not be a Grammy Award-winning recording artist or Astaire Award-winning dancer, but the Tony Award-winning stage and film star has something else: tons of charisma and an unerring sense of showmanship. Those qualities help make his concert, Hugh Jackman in Concert, now at San Francisco’s Curran Theatre, a don’t-miss, feel-good evening of energetic entertainment.”
— Theatre Mania

References

Concerts in the United States
Hugh Jackman